Eduard Brendler (4 November 1800 – 16 August 1831) was a Swedish composer. He was born in Dresden, Germany but his family moved to Sweden when he was only a year old. He died before completing his romantic opera Ryno, or the errant knight ("Ryno eller den vandrande riddaren: skådespel med sång i tre akter"), to a libretto by Bernhard von Beskow, so the opera was completed by his friend and patron the Crown Prince Oscar, and premiered in 1834.

References

Swedish composers
Swedish male composers
1800 births
1831 deaths
German emigrants to Sweden
19th-century composers
19th-century male musicians
19th-century musicians